The 2022 Texas Tech Red Raiders baseball team represented Texas Tech University during the 2022 NCAA Division I baseball season. The Red Raiders played their home games at Dan Law Field at Rip Griffin Park and competed as members of the Big 12 Conference. They were led by tenth-year head coach Tim Tadlock.

Previous season

The 2021 team finished the regular season with a record of 35–13, 14–10 in Big 12 play, finishing in third place in the conference. The team went 1–2 in the Big 12 Tournament, defeating Baylor in game one, but lost to eventual tournament winner TCU in game two and lost to Kansas State in the elimination game. In the NCAA Tournament, the team hosted the Lubbock Regional, winning the regional 3–0. The team advanced to the Lubbock Super Regional, being swept by Stanford, finishing the season with an overall record of 39–17.

Players drafted into the MLB

Personnel

Coaching staff

Roster

Schedule

"*" indicates a non-conference game.
"#" represents ranking. All rankings from D1Baseball on the date of the contest.
"()" represents postseason seeding in the Big 12 Tournament and NCAA Regional, respectively.

Rankings

Players drafted into the MLB

References

External links
2022 Baseball Schedule
2022 Baseball Roster

Texas Tech Red Raiders
Texas Tech Red Raiders baseball seasons
Texas Tech Red Raiders baseball
Texas Tech